Justice is a surname, sometimes by birth and occasionally adopted as part of a pseudonym.

People with this surname include:

By birth
 Ab Justice (1934–2013), American golfer
 Andrew Justice (1951–2005), British rower
 Arthur Justice (1902–1977), Australian rugby league footballer and coach
 Barbara Justice, American psychiatrist and oncologist
 Bill Justice (1914–2011), American animator and film engineer
 Carmen Justice (born 1991), American Christian recording artist and songwriter
 Carolyn H. Justice (fl. 2000s–2010s), North Carolina politician
 Charlie Justice (1924-2003), American football player
 Daniel Heath Justice, professor of First Nations and Indigenous Studies and English
 David Justice (born 1966), American Major League Baseball player
 Dick Justice (1906–1962), American blues and folk musician
 Donald Justice (1925–2004), American poet and teacher of writing
 Ed Justice (1912–1991), American football player
 Elizabeth Justice (née Elizabeth Surby) (1703–1752), British author
 Garin Justice (born 1982), American college football coach and former player
 James Robertson Justice (1907–1975), British actor
 Jim Justice (born 1951), American billionaire and politician
 Katherine Justice (born 1942), American actress
 Laura Justice (born 1968), American language scientist
 Marguerite P. Justice (1921–2009), American police commissioner
 Mark Justice (born c. 1970), American professional Magic: The Gathering player
 Rayven Justice (born 1991), American rapper, singer, and actor
 Steve Justice (born 1984), American football player
 Victoria Justice (born 1993), American actress and singer
 William Justice (disambiguation), various people
 William Justice (MP) (died 1521), English politician
 William J. Justice (born 1942), American Roman Catholic bishop
 William Wayne Justice (1920–2009), American jurist
 Winston Justice (born 1984), American football player

Adopted as a surname
 Count Justice (fl. 2000s–2010s), American songwriter, producer and engineer
 Matthew Justice (born 1988), American professional wrestler
 Sid Justice (born 1960), American professional wrestler
 Susan Justice (born 1981), American pop rock singer-songwriter and guitarist

Fictional characters
 Apollo Justice, fictional defense attorney in the fourth Ace Attorney game
 Buford T. Justice, fictional sheriff played by Jackie Gleason in Smokey and the Bandit films

See also
Justice (given name)
Justus (surname)